A scorotron (from screen controlled corona), also called a corona grid, is a device which creates corona discharge current, used in xerography.  Scorotrons appear in photocopiers, in xeroradiography equipment, and similar applications.

References

Radiography